Momenabad (also Romanized as Mo’menābād) is a city in and capital of Japelaq District, in Azna County, Lorestan Province, Iran. At the 2006 census, its population was 1,230, in 326 families.

References

Cities in Lorestan Province
Towns and villages in Azna County